General and Comparative Endocrinology is a peer-reviewed journal published by Elsevier which focuses on all aspects of the endocrine systems of vertebrates and invertebrates. It was established in 1961 and the editors-in-chief are R. M. Dores (University of Denver) and D. M. Power (University of the Algarve). According to the Journal Citation Reports, the journal has a 2012 impact factor of 2.823, ranking it 56th out of 122 journals in the category "Endocrinology & Metabolism".

References

Endocrinology journals
Elsevier academic journals
Publications established in 1961
English-language journals
Journals published between 13 and 25 times per year